The men's épée competition in fencing at the 2016 Summer Olympics in Rio de Janeiro was held on 9 August at the Carioca Arena 3. There were 38 competitors from 20 nations. South Korea's Park Sang-young won the individual gold, the first victory for South Korea in the event after bronze medals in 2000 and 2012. Géza Imre took silver, Hungary's first medal in the event since 1996. Imre, at age 41, was the oldest individual fencing medalist since 1952. Gauthier Grumier of France earned bronze.

In the final, Imre led 14-10 before Park scored the final 5 points to win 15–14.

Background

This was the 27th appearance of the event, which was not held at the first Games in 1896 (with only foil and sabre events held) but has been held at every Summer Olympics since 1900.

Five of the eight quarterfinalists from 2012 returned: gold medalist Rubén Limardo of Venezuela, bronze medalist Jung Jin-Sun of South Korea, fifth-place finisher Paolo Pizzo of Italy, sixth-place finisher Silvio Fernández of Venezuela, and seventh-place finisher Yannick Borel of France. Géza Imre of Hungary was the reigning (2015) World Champion; other World Champions competing in the event were Nikolai Novosjolov (2010 and 2013), Anton Avdeev (2009) and Pizzo (2011). France's Gauthier Grumier was the top seed in the tournament.

No nations made their debut in the event, though one Kuwaiti athlete competed as an Independent Olympic Athlete. France and the United States each appeared for the 25th time, tied for most among nations.

Qualification

Nations were limited to three fencers each from 1928 to 2004. However, the 2008 Games introduced a rotation of men's team fencing events with one weapon left off each Games; the individual event without a corresponding team event had the number of fencers per nation reduced to two. Men's épée was the second event this applied to, so each nation could enter a maximum of two fencers in the event in 2012. The team épée was back in 2016 (sabre the missing weapon for men), so the limit was three for 2016.

There were 35 dedicated quota spots for men's épée. The first 24 spots went to the 3 members of each of the 8 qualified teams in the team foil event. Next, 7 more men were selected from the world rankings based on continents: 2 from Europe, 2 from the Americas, 2 from Asia/Oceania, and 1 from Africa. Finally, 4 spots were allocated by continental qualifying events: 1 from Europe, 1 from the Americas, 1 from Asia/Oceania, and 1 from Africa.

Additionally, there were 8 host/invitational spots that could be spread throughout the various fencing events. Brazil used 3 of those places in the men's épée, resulting in a total of 38 competitors.

Competition format

The épée competition, following the format introduced in 1996, consisted of a six-round single-elimination bracket with a bronze medal match between the two semifinal losers. Fencing was done to 15 touches or to the completion of three three-minute rounds if neither fencer reached 15 touches by then. At the end of time, the higher-scoring fencer was the winner; a tie resulted in an additional one-minute sudden-death time period. This sudden-death period was further modified by the selection of a draw-winner beforehand; if neither fencer scored a touch during the minute, the predetermined draw-winner won the bout.

Schedule 

All times are Brasília Time (UTC-03:00)

Results

Top half

Section 1

Section 2

Bottom half

Section 3

Section 4

Finals

Results summary

References

Men's epee
Men's events at the 2016 Summer Olympics